Mamma Mia! Here We Go Again is a 2018 British-American jukebox musical romantic comedy film written and directed by Ol Parker, from a story by Parker, Catherine Johnson, and Richard Curtis. It is the sequel to the 2008 film Mamma Mia!, which in turn is based on the 1999 musical of the same name using the music of ABBA. The film features an ensemble cast, including Dominic Cooper, Amanda Seyfried, Pierce Brosnan, Colin Firth, Stellan Skarsgård, Jeremy Irvine, Josh Dylan, Hugh Skinner, Lily James, Jessica Keenan Wynn, Alexa Davies, Christine Baranski, Julie Walters, Andy García, Meryl Streep, and Cher. Both a prequel and a sequel, the plot is set after the events of the previous film, and is intersected with flashbacks to Donna's youth in 1979, with some scenes from the two time periods mirroring each other.

Due to the financial success of the first film, Universal Pictures had long been interested in a sequel. The film was officially announced in May 2017, with Parker hired to write and direct. In June 2017, many of the original cast confirmed their involvement, with James being cast in the role of Young Donna that July. Filming took place from August to December 2017 in Croatia (most prominently Vis), Bordeaux, Stockholm, Oxford, Hampton and at Shepperton Studios. A British and American joint venture, the film was co-produced by Playtone, Littlestar Productions, Perfect World Pictures, and Legendary Entertainment.

Mamma Mia! Here We Go Again was premiered at the Hammersmith Apollo in London on July 16, 2018, and was released in the United Kingdom and the United States on July 20, 2018, ten years to the week after its predecessor's release, in both standard and IMAX formats. The film was a box office success, grossing $402 million worldwide and received generally positive reviews, as an improvement over its predecessor with critics praising the performances and musical numbers.

The film is dedicated to the memory of production designer Alan MacDonald.

Plot
In a flashback to the year 1979, a young Donna Sheridan graduates from Oxford's New College with Rosie and Tanya ("When I Kissed the Teacher"), and dreams of a Greek island named Kalokairi. Donna's mother, Ruby, is a famous singer, but she has a strained relationship with her daughter and is consistently away on tour, and does not attend the graduation. Fed up with her mother's constant negligence and determined to spend her life making memories, Donna decided to travel to Kalokairi to find her destiny.

In the present, five years after the events of the first film, Sophie is in Kalokairi preparing for the grand reopening of the Hotel Bella Donna, in honour of her recently deceased mother. Harry and Bill are unable to attend due to overseas business ventures and Sophie also feels estranged from Sky, who's been offered a permanent job in New York ("One of Us").

In Paris, Donna meets the sweet but awkward Harry Bright, who instantly falls in love with her ("Waterloo"). They spend the night together, but Donna leaves soon after for Greece. She misses her boat to Kalokairi but is offered a ride by Bill Anderson in his yacht, and the two dance and flirt ("Why Did It Have to Be Me?"). On the way, they help a stranded fisherman, Alexio, back to shore in time to save the love of his life from having to marry another. Unbeknownst to Donna, Harry has followed her to Greece; however, he arrives too late and sadly watches the boat sailing off in the distance.

In the present, Rosie and Tanya arrive to support Sophie, and she shows them the new hotel ("I Have a Dream"). This mirrors the past, in which Donna explores an abandoned farmhouse that would eventually become the hotel. A heavy storm then breaks out and Donna discovers a trapped horse and soothes it with the assistance of Sam Carmichael. In the present, a heavy storm destroys the decorations and prevents transportation to Kalokairi, much to Sophie's dismay.

Sam, who has been living in a cabin on the island, reassures Sophie that she can never let her mother down, telling her the story of how he once let Donna down. Years ago, before Sophie was born, Donna and Sam were enjoying a whirlwind romance ("The Name of the Game"), but it ended badly when Donna found out Sam was engaged to another woman, Lorraine. Heartbroken, Donna breaks up with him and tearfully watches him leave the island ("Knowing Me, Knowing You"), while the present Sam reassures Sophie of her mother's value for her.

Following Sam's departure, Donna is visited by Tanya and Rosie, who cheer her up by singing with her as Donna and the Dynamos ("Mamma Mia"). Bill returns to the island, and Donna joins him on his boat, much to the chagrin of Rosie who falls for Bill. While they are gone, Sam returns, having ended his engagement for Donna, but is saddened to hear that she is with another man. Donna discovers she is pregnant but has no idea which one of her three recent lovers is the father. Bill's great-aunt Sofia overhears Donna's wish to stay on the island and reveals she owns the abandoned farmhouse Donna has been staying in. Donna happily accepts her offer to stay there, where she eventually gives birth to Sophie.

In the present, Sophie opens up to Rosie and Tanya about her conflict with Sky and Rosie explains to Sophie how she and Bill broke up ("Angel Eyes"). Meanwhile, Bill, Harry, and Sky leave their ventures abroad to support Sophie but are told there are no boats to Kalokairi. However, a much older Alexio recognises Bill and offers the trio safe boat passage to the island as gratitude for saving his relationship. Bill convinces the others to join them for a party on Kalokairi. When the guests arrive ("Dancing Queen"), Bill and Rosie quickly reunite over their mutual grief over Donna's death, and Sophie reveals to Sky that she is pregnant, and she has never felt closer to her mother.

The celebration is suddenly disrupted when Ruby arrives, despite Sophie having decided to not invite her. Ruby explains that Sky tracked her down in New York, and she wants to build a true relationship with her granddaughter. Sophie then performs with the Dynamos in honor of Donna ("I've Been Waiting for You"), much to the pride of Ruby, who expresses slight but sincere grief over her daughter's death. It is then revealed that the hotel manager, Señor Fernando Cienfuegos, is actually Ruby's long-lost lover from 1959, and the two are joyously reunited ("Fernando").

Nine months later, Sophie has given birth to a baby boy, named Donny. At the christening, Donna's ghost proudly watches over her daughter as the two of them have one final moment before Donna fully passes on ("My Love, My Life"). The end credits show all the characters, including Donna and the younger cast, at a huge party at Hotel Bella Donna ("Super Trouper").

Cast

 Amanda Seyfried as Sophie Sheridan, Donna's daughter, Ruby's granddaughter, Sam's stepdaughter, Sky's wife, and Donny's mother.
 Meryl Streep as Donna Sheridan-Carmichael, founder of Donna and the Dynamos, Sophie's late mother, Ruby's late daughter, Sam's late wife, Sky's late mother-in-law, Donny's late grandmother and best friend of Tanya & Rosie.
 Lily James as Young Donna.
 Dominic Cooper as Sky Ramand, Sophie's husband, Donna and Sam's son-in-law, and Donny's father.
 Christine Baranski as Tanya Chesham-Leigh, one of Donna's best friends and former bandmates in Donna and the Dynamos; a rich three-time divorcee.
 Jessica Keenan Wynn as Young Tanya.
 Julie Walters as Rosie Mulligan, one of Donna's best friends and former bandmates in Donna and the Dynamos; a fun-loving author in a relationship with Bill.
 Alexa Davies as Young Rosie.
 Pierce Brosnan as Sam Carmichael, an architect, Sophie's stepfather, Ruby's son-in-law, Sky's father-in-law, Donna's widower, and Donny's grandfather.
 Jeremy Irvine as Young Sam.
 Colin Firth as Harry Bright, a British businessman.
 Hugh Skinner as Young Harry.
 Stellan Skarsgård as Bill Anderson, a Swedish sailor and travel writer, Sofia's great-nephew and Lazaros's cousin. Skarsgard also plays Kurt Anderson, Bill's obese twin brother.
 Josh Dylan as Young Bill.
 Andy García as Señor Fernando Cienfuegos, the Mexican manager of the Hotel Bella Donna, who had an affair with Ruby in 1959.
 Cher as Ruby Sheridan, Donna's mother, Sophie's grandmother, Donny's great-grandmother, and Sam's mother-in-law.
 Maria Vacratsis as Sofia, Bill's great aunt, Lazaros's mother, and Sophie's namesake, a local who owns the shack in which Donna and Sam stay and which eventually becomes Donna's home.
 Panos Mouzourakis as Lazaros, Sofia's son
 Celia Imrie as the vice-chancellor of the university at which Donna, Tanya, and Rosie studied.
 Omid Djalili as a Greek customs officer.
 Gerard Monaco as Alexio
 Togo Igawa as Mr. Tatyama
 Naoko Mori as Yumiko
 Anastasia Hille as Dr. Inge Horvath

Cameo appearances
 Björn Ulvaeus as a university professor.
 Benny Andersson as the pianist in the Parisian restaurant during "Waterloo".
 Jonathan Goldsmith as Don Rafael Cienfuegos, brother of Fernando Cienfuegos.

Musical numbers

A soundtrack album was released on July 13, 2018, by Capitol and Polydor Records in the United States and internationally, respectively. The album was produced by Benny Andersson, who also served as the album's executive producer alongside Björn Ulvaeus and Judy Craymer. Each song is featured within the film, with the exception of "I Wonder (Departure)" and "The Day Before You Came".

 "When I Kissed the Teacher" – Young Donna and the Dynamos, Vice-Chancellor
 "I Wonder (Departure)" – Young Donna and the Dynamos†
 "One of Us" – Sophie and Sky
 "Waterloo" – Young Harry and Young Donna
 "Why Did It Have to Be Me?" – Young Bill, Young Donna and Young Harry
 "I Have a Dream" – Young Donna
 "Kisses of Fire" – Lazaros
 "Andante, Andante" – Young Donna
 "The Name of the Game" – Young Donna
 "Knowing Me, Knowing You" – Young Donna and Young Sam
 "Mamma Mia" – Young Donna and the Dynamos
 "Angel Eyes" – Rosie, Tanya, and Sophie
 "Dancing Queen" – Sophie, Rosie, Tanya, Sam, Bill, and Harry
 "I've Been Waiting for You" – Sophie, Rosie, and Tanya
 "Fernando" – Ruby, Fernando
 "My Love, My Life" – Young Donna, Donna, Sophie
 "Super Trouper" – Ruby, Donna, Rosie, Tanya, Sophie, Sky, Sam, Bill, Harry, Fernando, Young Donna, Young Rosie, Young Tanya, Young Bill, Young Sam, and Young Harry
 "The Day Before You Came" – Donna†

 † Songs featured on the soundtrack album but omitted from the film.

Additionally, short and instrumental versions of other ABBA songs were included in the movie, but omitted from the soundtrack. These are in chronological order

 "Thank You for the Music" – Sophie
 "I Let the Music Speak" – Instrumental
 "SOS" – Sam
 "Take a Chance on Me" – Instrumental
 "Hasta Mañana" – Helen Sjöholm (radio/voiceover)
 "Hole in Your Soul" – Lazaros
 "Slipping Through My Fingers" – Instrumental
 "Chiquitita" – Instrumental

Production

Development
Mamma Mia! Here We Go Again was announced on May 19, 2017, with a release date of July 20, 2018. It was written and directed by Ol Parker. On September 27, 2017, Benny Andersson confirmed 3 ABBA songs that would be featured in the film: "When I Kissed the Teacher," "I Wonder (Departure)," and "Angeleyes." "I Wonder (Departure)" was cut from the film, but is included on the soundtrack album.

Casting
On June 1, 2017, it was announced that Seyfried would return as Sophie. Later that month, Dominic Cooper confirmed that he would return for the sequel, along with Streep, Firth and Brosnan as Sky, Donna, Harry, and Sam, respectively. In July 2017, Baranski was also confirmed to return as Tanya. On July 12, 2017, Lily James was cast to play the role of young Donna. On August 3, 2017, Jeremy Irvine and Alexa Davies were also cast in the film, with Irvine playing Brosnan's character Sam in a past era, and Hugh Skinner to play Young Harry, Davies as a young Rosie, played by Julie Walters. On August 16, 2017, it was announced that Jessica Keenan Wynn had been cast as a young Tanya, who is played by Baranski. Julie Walters and Stellan Skarsgård also reprised their roles as Rosie and Bill, respectively. On October 16, 2017, it was announced that singer and actress Cher had joined the cast, in her first on-screen film role since 2010. The part was written specifically for Cher, and she got to choose Andy García as her romantic partner.

Filming

Principal photography on the film began on August 12, 2017, in Croatia, including the island of Vis. In October 2017, the cast gathered at Shepperton Studios in Surrey, England, to film song and dance numbers with Cher. Filming wrapped on December 2, 2017.

Release
Mamma Mia! Here We Go Again was released on July 20, 2018, by Universal Pictures, in the UK, US and other selected countries in both standard and IMAX formats. The film premiered on July 16, 2018, at the Hammersmith Apollo in London.

Marketing
The first trailer for the film was released on December 21, 2017, in front of Pitch Perfect 3, another Universal Pictures film. Cher performed "Fernando" at the Las Vegas CinemaCon on April 25, 2018, after footage of the film was shown.
Universal sponsored YouTube stars the Merrell Twins to perform a cover version of the song "Mamma Mia" to promote the film.

Home media
Mamma Mia! Here We Go Again was released via digital copy on October 9, 2018, and released on DVD, Blu-ray, and 4K UHD Combo Pack on October 23, 2018. The film debuted at the top of the
NPD VideoScan First Alert chart for the week ending on October 27, 2018. It retained the top spot on the chart for the week ending on November 3, 2018.

Reception

Box office
Mamma Mia! Here We Go Again grossed $120.6 million in the United States and Canada, and $281.6 million in other territories, for a total worldwide gross of $402.3 million, against a production budget of $75 million.

In June 2018, three weeks prior to its release, official industry tracking had the film debuting to $27–33 million, which increased to as much as $36 million by the week of its release. It made $14.3 million on its first day, including $3.4 million from Thursday night previews. It went on to debut to $35 million, finishing second, behind fellow newcomer The Equalizer 2 ($36 million), and besting the opening of the first film ($27.8 million) by over 24%. It fell 57% to $15.1 million in its second weekend, finishing second behind newcomer Mission: Impossible – Fallout. In its third weekend the film grossed $9 million, dropping to fourth place, and $5.8 million in its fourth weekend, finishing seventh.

In the United Kingdom, the film grossed $12.7 million in its opening weekend, topping the box office and achieving the fourth biggest opening for a film in 2018. In its second weekend of international release, the film made $26.6 million (for a running total of $98.6 million). Its largest new markets were France ($1.7 million), Poland ($1.3 million), Switzerland ($223,000) and Croatia ($151,000), while its best holdovers were Australia ($9.5 million), the UK ($8.6 million) and Germany ($8.2 million). In the United Kingdom, the film was the second highest-grossing film of 2018, following Avengers: Infinity War.

Critical response

The website's critical consensus reads, "Mamma Mia! Here We Go Again doubles down on just about everything fans loved about the original—and my my, how can fans resist it?" On Metacritic the film has a weighted average score of 60 out of 100 based on 46 critics, indicating "mixed or average reviews". Audiences polled by CinemaScore gave the film an average grade of "A−" on an A+ to F scale, the same score as its predecessor, while PostTrak reported filmgoers gave it an 83% overall positive score.

Peter Bradshaw of The Guardian termed the sequel as "weirdly irresistible" and gave it three out of five stars. He described his reaction to the first film as "a combination of hives and bubonic plague," but concedes that this time, the relentlessness and greater self-aware comedy made him smile. He concludes: "More enjoyable than I thought. But please. Enough now." Mark Kermode of The Observer gave the film five stars and commented, "This slick sequel delivers sharp one-liners, joyously contrived plot twists and an emotional punch that left our critic reeling."

Peter Travers of Rolling Stone awarded the film two and a half stars out of five, noting the absence of Streep for the majority of the film hindered his enjoyment, and saying, "her absence is deeply felt since the three-time Oscar winner sang and danced her heart out as Donna Sheridan". Lindsay Bahr of Associated Press awarded the film three out of four stars, calling it "wholly ridiculous", but complimenting its self-awareness. She also praised James' performance and singing talent. Richard Roeper of the Chicago Sun-Times gave the sequel a mixed review, awarding it two stars out of four, criticizing the reprises of "Dancing Queen" and "Super Trouper" as uninspired, and feeling that some of the musical numbers dragged the pacing. He considered the younger counterparts to the main characters "energetic" and "likeable." Stephanie Zacharek of Time gave the film a mixed review, writing "Mamma Mia! Here We Go Again is atrocious. And wonderful. It's all the reasons you should never go to the movies. And all the reasons you should race to get a ticket."

Sequel
In June 2020, Judy Craymer announced that a third film was in development, with the producer confirming that some of the new ABBA songs written for the band's reunion could feature in the soundtrack, although stating that the COVID-19 pandemic had caused delays with development of the project. After months of postponement, ABBA released their new album Voyage in November 2021.

Accolades

References

External links
 
 
 

2018 films
2010s musical comedy films
2018 romantic comedy films
2010s romantic musical films
American musical comedy films
American romantic musical films
American romantic comedy films
American sequel films
British musical comedy films
British romantic musical films
British romantic comedy films
British sequel films
2010s English-language films
ABBA
British pregnancy films
American pregnancy films
Films set in Greece
Films set in London
Films set in Manhattan
Films set in Oxford
Films set in Paris
Films set in England
Films set in Tokyo
Films set on islands
Films shot at Shepperton Studios
Films shot in Croatia
Films shot in London
Films shot in Oxfordshire
Films shot in Surrey
IMAX films
Jukebox musical films
Mamma Mia!
Films set in 1979
Playtone films
Universal Pictures films
Legendary Pictures films
Films directed by Ol Parker
Films produced by Gary Goetzman
Films scored by Anne Dudley
Films scored by Benny Andersson
American female buddy films
2010s female buddy films
2010s American films
2010s British films